David Riebe (born 1 May 1988, Hällestad, Skåne, Sweden) is a Swedish composer who has won second prize in Uppsala Composition Competition (Swedish: Uppsala tonsättartävling) in Sweden and third prize in the All-Russian Open Composers’ Competition in Honor of Andrey Petrov (Russian: Всероссийский открытый конкурс композиторов им. А.П. Петрова) in Saint Petersburg, Russia. In 2015 he was elected a member of the Swedish Society of Composers (Föreningen svenska tonsättare).

Riebe has a master's degree in composition from the Malmö Academy of Music in Sweden where he studied with Luca Francesconi, Rolf Martinsson, Staffan Storm and Kent Olofsson. He has also studied with Michele Tadini and Philippe Hurel at Conservatoire National Supérieur Musique et Danse (CNSMD) in Lyon, France.

Awards and honours 
 2012 – The Culture Grant of Lund Municipality
 2014 – Second prize in Uppsala Composition Competition (Swedish: Uppsala tonsättartävling) with the work Geopoliticus Child
 2016 – Third prize in "10th All-Russian composers’ open competition in honor of Andrey Petrov" with the work Magma

Selected works 
 2013 – Geopoliticus Child for sinfonietta
 2015 – Magma for symphonic orchestra
 2015 – Time Reflections for symphonic orchestra

References

External links 
 David Riebe’s official webpage

1988 births
Living people
People from Lund Municipality
Swedish composers
Swedish male composers